Idris Ruslanovich Zaynulabidov (born 4 April 1986) is a former Russian football player.

References

1986 births
Living people
Russian footballers
Russian expatriate footballers
Expatriate footballers in Belarus
Russian Premier League players
FC Akhmat Grozny players
FC Darida Minsk Raion players
Association football forwards
FC Lukhovitsy players